Rail transport in Angola consists of three separate Cape gauge lines that do not connect: the northern Luanda Railway, the central Benguela Railway, and the southern Moçâmedes Railway. The lines each connect the Atlantic coast to the interior of the country. A fourth system once linked Gunza and Gabala but is no longer operational.

History

Railway construction began in Angola in 1887, while the country was a colony of Portugal. The Luanda Railway opened in 1889, the Moçâmedes Railway opened in 1910, and the Benguela Railway opened in 1912. The railways continued to be extended inland until 1961, when the Moçâmedes Railway reached Menongue. After Angola attained its independence from Portugal in 1975, the Angolan Civil War broke out and lasted until 2002. The prolonged fighting resulted in the destruction of most of Angola's railway infrastructure. The rebels blew up bridges, tore up track, and sabotaged the right of way with land mines to prevent the railway from being restored.

When the fighting ended, the Angolan government sought to restore service on the railways. Contracts were awarded to the state-owned China Railway Construction Corporation Limited to rebuild the Luanda Railway and the Benguela Railway. A privately owned Chinese mining company rebuilt the Moçâmedes Railway. All three colonial-era Cape gauge lines had been rebuilt by 2015.

Statistics
 total: 2,761 km
 there is also 123 km of  gauge (2002)

Links with neighbouring countries
The Benguela Railway connects to the Katanga Railway at the border with the Democratic Republic of the Congo. The first train reached the border town of Luau in August 2013. However, the Congolese railways are in a deteriorated state and no through services are available as of 2015. Passengers and freight must use buses and trucks to reach destinations in Congo.

Towns served by rail

Specifications

 Brakes: Air
 Couplers: AAR

Rolling stock

Locomotives

Railways rehabilitation and modernization programme
After the end of the civil war, the government could start to plan both the rehabilitation of the "network" inherited from the colonial power and largely destroyed by the civil war, and its extension by building new lines, interconnecting the existing lines and connecting with all neighbouring countries. If and when completed, this would result in a grid of three east–west lines and three north–south lines, linking all 18 provinces to the railway network. This plan is known also by the name Ango-Ferro.

New institutional framework
Related to the program to rehabilitate the network inherited from colonial times and the project to build new lines, the institutional framework of railway operations was changed in a series of presidential decrees in 2010.

As the public administrator to oversee, regulate, certify and licence railway companies, infrastructure and rolling stock, the Instituto Nacional dos Caminhos de Ferro de Angola (INCFA – National Institute for Railways in Angola) was created out of the Directorate of Terrestrial Transport within the transport ministry.

All railway infrastructure, lines, tracks, stations and maintenance facilities were declared to be in the public domain controlled by the state. The three railway companies became Empresa publica (E.P.), government operated enterprises reporting to the transport ministry.  The infrastructure was separated from the operation of the trains, opening up the possibility that private companies could run trains in the future.

Technical integration with SADC countries

Most railways in the SADC (Southern African Development Community) countries run on Cape gauge , which facilitates the planned integration of the Angolan railway network with neighbouring countries without requiring trans-shipment at border crossings. To maximize the technical interoperability of rolling stock, the AAR coupler was adopted, which is used in South Africa.

The Southern African Railways Association (SARA) is the body for this standardisation. The three Angolan railway companies are members of SARA.

Planned new lines
As at 2012, the plan involves eight new lines:

Caminho de Ferro do Congo
This line would start at downtown Luanda and reach the Congo mouth at Soyo and then Cabinda via a wide eastwards curve passing through Caxito, Ucua, Quibaxe, Dande, Uíge, Songo, Lucunga, Madimba, Zaire, M'banza-Kongo, Quiende, Lufico to Soyo. The line would then cross the Congo river between Soyo and Munanda, continue for about 40 km through the Democratic Republic of the Congo (DRC) before re-entering Angolan territory in the Cabinda province at Imã to reach Cabinda city, and continue from there via Landana, Buco Zau, Belize, Cabinda to Miconje, where it would connect with the rail network of Congo Brazzaville. This line would be 950 kilometres in length.
 
In an earlier document from the transport ministry, there was a border crossing to DRC planned further up-stream, where the Congo river is not so wide and where the DRC/Angola border moves away from the river bank, i.e. at Noqui (Angola) and Matadi (DRC).

Link with Zambia
This would branch off the Benguela railway at Luacano and go south-east via Lago Dilolo, Sapito, Moxico, Samucal, Cazombo, Camanga, and Calunda to Macongo, where it would link to the line serving a mine at Lumwana in Zambia. This line would be about 306 km long. A feasibility study is pending.

Western link to Namibia
This link of probably 343 km would start from the Moçâmedes railway (CFM) at Cuvango and to south via Cassai, Xamutete, Cuvelai, Mupa, Evale, Ondjiva to Namacunde, where it would connect with the Namibian line Tsumeb to Oshikango. This link had also been discussed during a state visit of the Angolan president to Windhoek in Namibia in October 2007. A feasibility study is pending.

Lobito-Dar es Salaam Railway

Extension of the Luanda railway to Saurimo
The Luanda railway would be extended beyond Malanje by 527 km via Caculama, Xá Muteba, Capenda, Camulemba, Cacolo, to Saurimo in Lunda Sul province. There it would link with the Eastern north–south line, specified in the next section. A feasibility study is pending .

Transversal do Leste (Eastern transversal)
This new line would extend 1353 km from north to south, beginning at the border with the DRC at Chitato, then via Luachimo, Dundo, Camissombo and Lucapa to Saurimo where it would connect with the planned new endpoint of the Luanda railway, then onto Camanogue and Luena where it would connect with the Benguela railway, then onto Lucusse, Cassamba, Cangombe and Lupire to Cuito Cuanavale where it would connect with the planned new endpoint of the Moçâmedes railway (CFM), and then via Mavinga to Mucusso on the Okavango river, where it would connect to the Tsumeb – Caprivi line in Namibia. A feasibility study is pending.

Extension of the Moçamedes railway to Cuito Cuanavale
This would extend the existing line by about 180 km beyond the current end point Menongue via Longa to Cuito Cuanavale where it would connect with the Transversal do Leste. A feasibility study is pending.

Transversal Norte-Sul (North-South transversal)
This central north–south line of 896 km in length would start at Uíge, from the planned Congo railway going south from there via Negage, Camabatela, Luinga, and Calandula to Malanje, the current end point of the Luanda railway, and then from there further south via Cangandala, Mussende, Calussinga, Andulo, and Cuhinga to Kuito, where it would connect with the existing Benguela railway, and from there via Chitambo and Cuvango, where it would connect with the existing Moçâmedes railway and the planned new line to Oshikango in Namibia. A feasibility study is pending.

Interconnection of the three historic lines
This new line of 589 km would start as an extension of the existing Dondo branch of the Luanda railway, and go south via Quibala and Waco Kungo to Huambo, connecting there to the existing Benguala railway, continuing further south via Cuima to Cuvango, where it would connect, like the Transversal Norte-Sul, to the existing Moçâmedes railway and the planned new line to Oshikango in Namibia. A feasibility study is pending.

This line would create a direct rail link from the capital Luanda to Angola's second city Huambo and to Namibia.

Implementation
Speaking to the press in July 2012, on the occasion of the coming opening of the reconstructed CFB line to Luena, the director of the INCFA, Júlio Bango Joaquim, said that the construction of new lines would begin as soon as the three historic lines are operational in their full length. He placed the direct link to Zambia, bypassing the DRC, on top of the priority list, the link to Namibia coming next.

See also

Angolan Civil War
Benguela railway
History of rail transport in Angola
Luanda Railway
Moçâmedes Railway
Transport in Angola

References

External links
 INCFA website
 Section on railways at the Portal dos Transportes of the transport ministry
 Transport ministry of Angola
 UNJLC Map